Cowderoy is a surname. Notable people with the surname include:

Cyril Cowderoy (1905–1976), English Roman Catholic archbishop
Jacqui Cowderoy (born 1961), Australian alpine skier
John Cowderoy (1851–1934), English cricketer

See also
Cowdery